Nelson Austin Kellogg (January 30, 1881  – November 23, 1945) was a track athlete, American football, basketball, and baseball coach, and college athletics administrator.  He served as the head football coach at Northern Illinois State Normal School—now known as Northern Illinois University—from 1906 to 1909, compiling a record of 8–17–3.  Kellogg was also the head basketball coach at Northern Illinois from 1906 to 1910, amassing a record of 17–27, and the head baseball coach at the school from 1907 to 1910, tallying a mark of 26–17.  He ran track at the University of Michigan, from which he graduated in 1904.

Kellogg left Northern Illinois to become the University of Iowa's first athletic director in 1910 and served in that capacity until leaving for World War I in 1917.  He was the athletic director at Purdue University from 1919 to 1930 and at Lehigh University from 1934 until he retired on February 11, 1939.  Kellogg died at the age of 64 on November 23, 1945 at his home in Central Lake, Michigan.

Head coaching record

Football

References

External links
 

1881 births
1945 deaths
Iowa Hawkeyes athletic directors
Lehigh Mountain Hawks athletic directors
Michigan Wolverines men's track and field athletes
Northern Illinois Huskies baseball coaches
Northern Illinois Huskies football coaches
Northern Illinois Huskies men's basketball coaches
Purdue Boilermakers athletic directors
American military personnel of World War I